In comics, Osiris may refer to:

Osiris (DC Comics), there are three DC Comics characters with this name
Osiris (Marvel Comics), the Marvel Comics version of the god

See also
Osiris (disambiguation)